James Tin-Yau So (1911–2000; Chinese name: 苏天佑) was an acupuncturist who founded one of the first acupuncture schools in the United States, in 1974.

See also
 Traditional Chinese Medicine
 Classical Chinese Medicine

References

1911 births
2000 deaths
Acupuncturists